The 2018–19 Euro Hockey Tour was the 23rd season of Euro Hockey Tour. It started in November 2018 and lasted until May 2019. It consisted of Karjala Tournament, Channel One Cup, Sweden Hockey Games and Carlson Hockey Games.

Final standings

Karjala Tournament

The Karjala Cup was played between 8–11 November 2018. Five of the matches were played in Helsinki, Finland and one match in Prague, Czech Republic. The tournament was won by Russia.

Channel One Cup 

The 2018 Channel One Cup was played between 13–16 December 2018. Four matches were played in Moscow, Russia, one match was held in Tampere, Finland and one match as an outdoor game in Saint Petersburg, Russia. The tournament was won by Russia.

Sweden Hockey Games

The 2019 Sweden Hockey Games were played between 7–10 February 2019. Five of the games were played in Stockholm, Sweden and one game in Yaroslavl, Russia. The tournament was won by Czech Republic.

Carlson Hockey Games

The 2019 Carlson Hockey Games were played between 1–5 May 2019. Five of the games were played in Brno, Czech Republic and one game in Stockholm, Sweden. Tournament was won by Sweden.

External links
 European Hockey Tour on Eurohockey.com

References 

Euro Hockey Tour
2018–19 in European ice hockey